The Gladiator Tactical Unmanned Ground Vehicle (Gladiator TUGV) program was an unmanned vehicle designed by Emil Lien Akre in 2005. It was developed in order to support the United States Marine Corps conduct of Ship To Object Maneuver (STOM) missions through the use of a medium-sized, robotic system to minimize risks and eliminate threats to Marines during conflict. Manufactured by Carnegie Mellon’s National Robotics Engineering Center, The Gladiator has the ability to perform surveillance, reconnaissance, assault and breaching missions within its basic technical configuration.

Essential functions 
 Utilize remote imagery software to relay images (including day and night), and thermal images.
 Battlefield support, including surveillance, reconnaissance, assault and breaching missions.
Modular design to allow for the attachment of standard interfaces for mission payloads (for example electric megaphone and/or siren/dazzler/tear-gas generator/searchlight sub-system[s]).
 Armored to remain operational after being assaulted with ammunition up to 7.62mm rounds.

Development 
The Gladiator Program is a U. S. Marine Corps initiative based on the Joint Army-Marine Corps Tactical Unmanned Vehicle (TUV) ORD originated by the Infantry School. MNS INT 12.1.1, dated 4 November 1993, validated the need for a tactical unmanned ground vehicle system, and the Army approved the ORD in August 1995 and by the Marine Corps in May 1996. Existing unmanned vehicles contained several deficiencies which caused both Army and Marine Corps developers to reevaluate design aspects. Developments of the Gladiator allow it to support dismounted infantry and aid in scout/surveillance, direct engagement, and obstacle breaching missions.

The Marine Corps began development of the Gladiator by developing a Concept Validation Model (CVM) vehicle. The original concept for Gladiator was a vehicle that could provide reconnaissance, obscurant, and APOBS capabilities to the front line Marines. The original vehicle size was set so that two Gladiators would be able to fit into the back of an HMMWV. The first version of Gladiator was developed by a team of Government Contract Companies located in the Huntsville, Alabama area but it was soon found that the requirement for two TUGVs to fit into a HMMWV made the original Gladiator CVM  design top heavy and impractical.

The Marine Corps changed the size requirement to one vehicle to fit into a HMMWV and move development in 2002 to the Unmanned Ground Vehicles Technology Development group, headed by Robert Wade, at the Software Engineering Directorate located on Redstone Arsenal in Huntsville, Alabama. The GVTD team was led by a mechanical engineer Keith Foslien (Government), the systems and software engineer was Brad Troyer (SAIC), the electrical engineer was Bill Brown, fabrication was Vince Davis and Mark Schulke.

There were three Gladiator CVMs developed for the Marine Corps, the first was a diesel-powered tracked vehicle (shown above) while the other two were 6-wheeled hybrid electric vehicles. The original tracked CVM had a reconnaissance and weapon head, which were quickly combined into one head that could provide both functions. The capability of the vehicles increased over the three year CVM program. The vehicles were able to support direct fire using the M240 & M249 machine guns, UZI 9mm machine gun, and the FN303 less lethal weapon. They possessed night vision capabilities and could also geolocate a target and provide a firing solution to the operator for indirect engagement of the target. The Gladiator CVM was the first safe and successful weaponized TUGV in the world.

The Gladiator CVMs were used to develop and judge TUGV capabilities, requirements, and TTPs. With the input from CVM program, an RFP for Gladiator production went out to industry. Upon the approval of the new design on February 7, 2005, Carnegie Mellon University's National Robotics Engineering Consortium and United Defense Industries were awarded a contract for over $26 million for the System Development and Demonstration (SDD) phase of the Gladiator. In 2007, six pre-production models were manufactured and the next step was to produce several hundred in production.  The US Marines elected not to go into production with the units.  These six prototypes were sent to the Army and later five of the six were placed into a CRADA between the Army and Cybernet Systems Corporation.  Two of these units were refitted to full autonomous operations under a contract to develop the Unit-to-Unit Autonomous Resupply Vehicle (U2UARV).  Among other changes to the Gladiator, the weapons platforms were removed and replaced with interfaces to carry JMIC pallets (Joint Modular Intermodal Containers).

Purpose 
The Gladiator was designed with the intent to be easily transported to different parts of the battlefield.  Adaptable to many types of environments, the Gladiator was to enhance the ability of Marines to accomplish assigned mission tasks. The purpose of the Gladiator was to be Tele operated just forward of the Marine units, performing basic scouting/surveillance, obstacle breaching, and reconnaissance tasks while permitting the operator to remain out of the line of danger.

The Gladiator TUGV is a robust, compact, unmanned, tele-operated, multi-purpose ground reconnaissance, surveillance, and target acquisition (RSTA) vehicle system possessing a scouting and direct engagement capability. It provides the armed forces with remote reconnaissance, surveillance, and target acquisition, nuclear, biological and chemical reconnaissance, obstacle breaching, and direct fire capability to neutralize threats and reduce risk to the warfighter. After refitting it for cargo carrying and autonomous operations over terrain and roads, it also provides small unit resupply features.  The TUGV system can be utilized by infantry battalions and combat engineering companies. It's small enough to be strategically, operationally, and tactically deployed worldwide for ground, aircraft and sea transport missions.

Configuration 
The Gladiator is configured such that it can be considered a Mobile Base Unit, able to carry extra ammunition or other payload while at the same time maintaining the above-mentioned capabilities. Due to its unmanned nature, each Gladiator is equipped with a remote control unit capable of displaying mission data, operational status and mission surveillance. The exchange between the Gladiator and the remote control unit is expected to be transmitted through a non-tethered military link.

Status 
 the TUGV was classified as "under development." By 2014 it still carries that status.

See also

 Armored Combat Engineer Robot (ACER), military robot
 Black Knight
 Foster-Miller TALON
 XM1219 Armed Robotic Vehicle
 SGR-A1

External links
USMC Article
GlobalSecurity Page
U2UARV

United States Marine Corps equipment
Unmanned ground combat vehicles
Military vehicles introduced in the 2000s